Nimiaghat is a railway station on the  Asansol–Gaya section of Grand Chord. It is located in Giridih district in the Indian state of Jharkhand.  It is located at the base of Shikharji (Parasnath Hill) and is on one of the routes for climbing the hill. Nimiaghat station is also having DVC power transmission station.

History
The Grand Chord was opened in 1906.

Electrification
The Gomoh–Koderma sector was electrified in 1961–62.

References

External links
 Trains at Nimiaghat

Railway stations in Giridih district
Dhanbad railway division